Melrude is an unincorporated community in Ellsburg Township, Saint Louis County, Minnesota, United States.

The community is located eight miles northeast of Cotton at the intersection of Saint Louis County Road 59 (Melrude Road) and County Road 322 (Lee Road).

Paleface Creek flows through the community, and the Paleface River is nearby.

References

 Rand McNally Road Atlas – 2007 edition – Minnesota entry
 Official State of Minnesota Highway Map – 2011/2012 edition

Unincorporated communities in Minnesota
Unincorporated communities in St. Louis County, Minnesota